Hewes may refer to:

Ships
, a ship acquired by the US Navy 8 January 1942 and sunk 11 November 1942
, a Knox class frigate launched 7 March 1970 and transferred to Taiwan in 1999

Other
Hewes Street (BMT Jamaica Line), a local station on the BMT Jamaica Line of the New York City Subway
Hewes Point, a peninsula in Maine
Rip Hewes Stadium, a 10,000-seat stadium located in Dothan, Alabama
Hewes v. M'Dowell, (1 U.S. 5; 1762), an early decision of a Pennsylvania Provincial Court

People with the surname
Joseph Hewes (1730–1779), signer of the United States Declaration of Independence
Bettie Hewes (1921–2001), Canadian politician
David Hewes (1822–1915), American industrialist
George Robert Twelves Hewes (1742–1840), one of the last survivors of the American Revolution
Henry Hewes (critic) (1917–2006), American theater writer for Saturday Review
Henry Hewes (politician) (born 1949), American activist
Billy Hewes (born 1961), American politician
Patty Hewes, a fictional character from Damages (TV series)

See also
HEW (disambiguation)
Hues (disambiguation)
Hus (disambiguation)
Hews (disambiguation)